"Sacrifices" is a song by American rapper Big Sean from his fourth studio album I Decided (2017). It features American hip hop group Migos and was produced by Metro Boomin, with co-production from Allen Ritter.

Lyrics
Lyrically, the song finds Big Sean, Offset and Quavo addressing the sacrifices they have made to become the successful artists they are.

Critical reception
The song was met with generally positive reviews from music critics. Brittany Spanos of Rolling Stone commented that Big Sean is "no match for the affable charm of Migos" in the song. Andy Belt of Consequence praised the Metro Boomin's production of the song, writing that it grounds "some of the rapper's sillier lines". Eric Renner Brown of Entertainment Weekly also wrote favorably of the song's production, stating that it "proves classical harpsichords and Southern trap aren't mutually exclusive." A. Harmony of Exclaim! was more critical of the song, describing it as "fun, but ultimately shallow compared to the album's weighty storyline." Matthew Strauss of Pitchfork considered "Sacrifices" the best song from I Decided.

Music video
The official music video was released on May 19, 2017. Directed by Kid Studio, it sees Big Sean speeding on a motorcycle through the streets of a city at night, driving through tunnels and on bridges. As he rides, the taillights of his bike emits a trailing stream of lights. Between shots of him speeding in the streets, Sean is also seen posing with Migos in an abandoned warehouse. At the end of the video, Sean crashes into another vehicle, sending him flying into the air.

Charts

Certifications

References

2017 songs
Big Sean songs
Migos songs
Song recordings produced by Metro Boomin
Song recordings produced by Allen Ritter
Songs written by Big Sean
Songs written by Metro Boomin
Songs written by Allen Ritter
Songs written by Quavo
Songs written by Offset (rapper)